An exoskeleton car has a visible external frame, being made of steel, aluminum or carbon fiber tubes. 

Body styles are open wheel sports cars, with their wheels outside of the main body and each wheel covered by its own lightweight mudguard, usually carried as unsprung weight supported on the hub carrier. The chassis has four large longitudinal tubes, two on each side of the car body, inboard of the wheels. These main chassis tubes are spaced apart by smaller diagonal or vertical tubes.

Structurally, an exoskeleton chassis is midway between a ladder chassis and a spaceframe chassis. At its simplest, it consists of two ladder chassis, one above the other. The classic ladder chassis is stiff against sideways forces, but weak against vertical bending forces. Using paired tubes, separated vertically, makes the chassis much stiffer in this direction. Unlike a spaceframe though, the main forces act as bending loads upon these tubes, rather than the pure tension or compression forces of the true spaceframe.

A drawback to the exoskeleton is that there is no chance to cut doors through the upper suspension tubes. The car style is thus restricted to low-slung cars, for agile drivers prepared to climb out over their high sills.

The simplistic construction of the vehicle follows Colin Chapman's philosophy of maximizing the power-to-weight ratio by minimising weight rather than simply adding power. Early monocoque racing cars such as the Lotus 25 had their chassis exposed but the term exoskeletal is more usually reserved for vehicles with an exposed space frame, such as sandrails, dune buggies or specialized light weight track cars.

Examples of exoskeleton cars

Ariel Atom
Deronda Type F
KTM X-Bow
MEV Rocket, Atomic, tR1ke, Missile, Eco-Exo and Exocet

See also
Vehicle frame
Monocoque
Dune buggy
List of motorized trikes
GG Quadster
Exoskeleton; framework in some animals

References

Automotive chassis types
Sports cars